The Las Aves Archipelago is a pristine archipelago in the Caribbean Sea, and is part of the Federal Dependencies of Venezuela. The prime economic importance of the islands lies in fishing. "Las Aves" translates to "The Birds" in English.

History

Las Aves was the site of a major Dutch victory over the French in 1678, when a French fleet commanded by Admiral Jean d'Estrées on its way to capture the nearby Dutch island Curaçao was decoyed onto the reefs of Aves de Sotovento by a small force of three Dutch ships. When D'Estrees' ship hit the reef, he fired cannons as a warning to the ships behind. However, they interpreted the signal to mean that he was under attack so they came rushing to his aid - and likewise struck the reefs.

The entire French fleet of 13 ships was lost as a result of the Admiral's eagerness to fight. The survivors found no fresh water on Las Aves. They tried to survive on barrels of wine and salted meat that washed up ashore. But these supplies ran out and eventually they perished. The Admiral was one of the few to be rescued. On Curaçao, a Day of Thanksgiving was observed until far into the 18th century to commemorate the island's fortunate escape from being ravaged by the French.

Las Aves was considered by the Dutch as part of their West Indian possessions. In The Dutch West Indies (Amsterdam, 1836), Marten Douwes Teenstra wrote "The Government of Curaçao also includes the uninhabited islets and rocks Little Curaçao, Aves, Roques and Orchilla."

In 1978 Venezuela and the Kingdom of the Netherlands established the marine limits between the Federal Dependencies and the Dutch Antilles in the Caribbean Sea.

Geography

The archipelago consists of two atoll-like reef complexes:

Aves de Barlovento, the eastern group, with a fringing reef of 8 km of diameter and with three cays in the southwest
Isla Aves de Barlovento
Isla Tesoro
Cayo Bubi
Cayo de Las Bobas
Aves de Sotavento, the western group, with Isla Maceta, a large mangrove-covered cay in the south.
Isla Aves de Sotavento
Isla Larga
Cayo Tirra
Isla Saquisaqui
Cayos de La Colonia
Isla Maceta
Cayo Sterna

In total, there are 21 islets and islands in both groups. The archipelago is not to be confused with Aves Island, which is the most remote island claimed by Venezuela, far to the north.

Gallery

See also
Federal Dependencies of Venezuela
List of marine molluscs of Venezuela
List of sponges of Venezuela

References

Federal Dependencies of Venezuela
Venezuelan islands of the Leeward Antilles
Atolls of Venezuela
Coral reefs